The Bradley-Burns Uniform Local Sales and Use Tax Law is Part 1.5, Division 2 of the Revenue and Taxation Code of California. It allows a percentage to be added to a statewide sales tax, with the proceeds applied to benefit counties and cities. Generally the revenue obtained from the uniform local tax funds various county and city needs such as transportation and operation funds.

See also
 Taxation in California

External links

 Text of the code
 California State Board of Equalization

Local taxation in the United States